Maximo or Máximo may refer to:

Arts
 Capcom video game series
 Maximo: Ghosts to Glory (also known as just Maximo)
 Maximo vs. Army of Zin, the sequel to Ghosts to Glory
 Maxïmo Park, a British indie rock band
 Maximu or Maximo, a legendary female warrior descended from the Amazons who is killed by Basil Digenes Akritas

People
 Joel and Jose Maximo, a wrestling tag team known as The S.A.T.
 Máximo (wrestler) (born 1980), ring name of Mexican wrestler José Christian Nieves Ruiz
 Maximo Blanco (born 1983), Venezuelan professional Mixed Martial Artist
 Máximo Gómez (1836–1905), military commander of the Cuba independence campaign
 Máximo Macapobre, Filipino activist and the founder of Toledo City, Philippines
 Máximo Rigondeaux (born 1976), Cuban javelin thrower
 Máximo Santos (1847–1889), Uruguay president
 Máximo Tajes (1852–1912), Uruguay president
 Maximo V. Lorenzo (born 1982), comic artist.
 Maximo V. Soliven, Filipino journalist
 Maximo Yabes (1932–1967), born in Lodi, California, was a United States Army soldier
 Maximos the Confessor, one of the fathers of the Orthodox Church

Other
 Maximo, Ohio
 Maximo (software)